Laura Nicholls (born September 25, 1978) is a Canadian former competition swimmer who won ten international medals in freestyle events, including the Pan Pacific Swimming Championships, Commonwealth Games and Pan American Games.  Nicholls represented Canada at two consecutive Summer Olympics, starting in 1996 in Atlanta, Georgia.  There she finished in 29th position in the 50-metre freestyle.  Four years later in Sydney, Australia, she reached the final with the Canadian relay teams, finishing seventh in the 4x100-metre freestyle, and sixth in the 4x100-metre medley. Laura Nicholls is currently a coach with the Guelph Marlins Aquatic Club in Guelph.

References

External links
Canadian Olympic Committee

1978 births
Living people
Canadian female freestyle swimmers
Olympic swimmers of Canada
Sportspeople from Kitchener, Ontario
Swimmers at the 1996 Summer Olympics
Swimmers at the 1999 Pan American Games
Swimmers at the 2000 Summer Olympics
Swimmers from Ontario
Commonwealth Games medallists in swimming
Commonwealth Games bronze medallists for Canada
Pan American Games gold medalists for Canada
Pan American Games silver medalists for Canada
Pan American Games bronze medalists for Canada
Swimmers at the 1998 Commonwealth Games
Swimmers at the 2002 Commonwealth Games
Pan American Games medalists in swimming
Medalists at the 1999 Pan American Games
Medallists at the 1998 Commonwealth Games
Medallists at the 2002 Commonwealth Games